Dragon Gate USA (DGUSA) was an American professional wrestling promotion founded in 2009 as an international expansion of the Japanese promotion Dragon Gate. 
Gabe Sapolsky, former head booker of Ring of Honor, served as the promotion's Vice President.

History
Dragon Gate USA featured regular members of the Dragon Gate roster, along with notable American talent. All Dragon Gate titles and champions were recognized by Dragon Gate USA.

In June 2009, it was announced that Dragon Gate USA had signed an agreement to film its shows for pay-per-view broadcast. In August 2009, it was announced that Dragon Gate USA had signed an agreement with The Fight Network to air DGUSA content on television.

The first Open the Freedom Gate Champion was crowned following a tournament held at DGUSA Freedom Fight on November 28, 2009. This was the main title of Dragon Gate USA.

On September 7, 2010, Dragon Gate USA announced a partnership with Go Fight Live and that their first live internet pay-per-view, Bushido: Way of the Warrior (later renamed Bushido: Code of the Warrior), would be taking place on October 29.

In the fall of 2010, DGUSA announced that it would be holding a tournament to crown the first  Open the United Gate Champions, which was their tag team champions. It was announced on December 13, 2010, that the tournament would be a four team round robin tournament that would take place over three shows from January 28 through January 30, 2011.

On November 25, 2011, Dragon Gate USA and Evolve announced the unification of the two promotions. Dragon Gate USA and Evolve will still promote separate events, but the two share rosters, including stables, and Evolve recognized Dragon Gate USA's Open the Freedom Gate Championship and Open the United Gate Championship as its top two championships, until establishing its own championship, the Evolve Championship in 2012. On September 18, 2013, Vito LoGrasso announced that his new Wrestling School signed an agreement to be the Development Center for DGUSA.

In November 2014, Dragon Gate USA, along with Evolve, Full Impact Pro (FIP) and Shine Wrestling, all under the WWNLive banner, held a tour of China. The following month, WWNLive announced a long-term deal with Great-Wall International Sports Management for regular tours of Asia, starting in the spring of 2015. On December 22, WWNLive announced it was putting Dragon Gate USA on an indefinite hiatus until the promotion could secure more Japanese wrestlers for their shows.

In 2015, WWNLive opened a training facility in Trinity, Florida named "World Wrestling Network Academy", which Dragon Gate USA shares with Evolve, FIP and Shine.

On July 2, 2020, Dragon Gate USA's video library along with Evolve's assets were bought by WWE.

Uprising

Uprising was a professional wrestling pay-per-view (PPV) event produced by Dragon Gate USA that was taped May 8, 2010 at the Mississauga International Centre in Mississauga, Ontario and aired on July 9, 2010.

Partnerships
Working agreements between Dragon Gate USA and the following promotions have led to interchanges in talent. Also, matches from these promotions have appeared on Dragon Gate USA DVD releases.

Chikara (established April 26, 2009)
All American Wrestling (established June 15, 2009)
Hybrid Wrestling (established June 15, 2009)
Full Impact Pro (established September 28, 2009)
Jeff Peterson Memorial Cup (established October 13, 2009)
Women Superstars Uncensored (established October 14, 2009)
Maximum Pro Wrestling (established March 3, 2010)
Rampage Pro Wrestling
Combat Zone Wrestling
New York Wrestling Connection
Insanity Pro Wrestling

Championships

References

External links

2009 in professional wrestling
American independent professional wrestling promotions based in Pennsylvania
American companies established in 2009
2009 establishments in Pennsylvania
Dragon Gate (wrestling)
American companies disestablished in 2015
2015 disestablishments in Pennsylvania
Entertainment companies disestablished in 2015
WWE